Branford College is one of the 14 residential colleges at Yale University.

Founding

Branford College was founded in 1933 by partitioning the Memorial Quadrangle (built in 1917-21) into two parts: Saybrook and Branford.  According to Robert Frost, it is "the oldest and most beautiful" of the Yale residential colleges, though it shares a building and was founded simultaneously with Saybrook. In the start of the academic year in 1933, Branford College opened its doors. Clarence Whittlesey Mendell, Dean of Yale College, had been named Master in 1931 and he held the post until 1943. What impressed quite a few visitors to Branford was the calm and subdued character of the College. Chauncey Tinker commented that Saybrook was like an anthill, but Branford was like an oyster bed. In records of the time, the main thing that stands out about Branford is the activity among its students, and of encouragement of activity on the part of Master Mendell, who commented that oyster beds produce pearls.

Branford College was named for the nearby town of Branford, Connecticut, where Yale was briefly located.  The base of Harkness Tower, one of the university's most prominent structures and one of the tallest free-standing stone structures in the world, forms one corner of Branford's main courtyard.  The tower contains a 54-bell carillon.  Frank Lloyd Wright is said to have been asked where he would choose to be if he could be anywhere in the U.S. and responded that he would pick Harkness Tower so he would not have to look at it.  Since Branford's courtyards have many squirrels, the college adopted the squirrel as its mascot.

The college has a longstanding rivalry with neighboring Jonathan Edwards College as well as a less formal one with Saybrook, both of which frequently attempt to steal Branford's college flag. Branford is the sister college of Quincy House at Harvard, Pembroke College at Oxford and Christ's College at Cambridge. It is tradition for Branfordians to host members of Quincy House when Yale hosts Harvard during The Game.

Facilities

There are two "common rooms" in addition to the primary common room (located underneath the Dining Hall). Located between Linonia and Branford Courts is the Fellows' Lounge, where the Fellows of the College meet. This room is called the Trumbull Room, in memory of the first art gallery at Yale, which was built to house the paintings of John Trumbull.

The Branford Dining Hall is located above the common room parallel to York Street. The large, vaulted main dining hall contains a 15th-century Burgundian fireplace. A smaller, cozier room traditionally called The Pit, also known as the Small Dining Hall, is frequently reserved by student groups for dinner meetings.

The other "Common Room" is the Mendell Room, named for Branford's first master, Clarence Whittlesey Mendell. Confusingly, this room also had several other names. It was originally dubbed the "Cabinet Commons" when it was constructed. It quickly came to be known as the "Ship Room" after the carving over the mantle, which depicts the phantom "Great Ship" lost at sea off the coast of New Haven. During the early days of the College, it was used as a "Music Room," and a record player was installed for the use of College students. It was only after the death of Master Mendell that the room was renamed in his honor. The room, which is located between the Branford and Brothers in Unity Courts (joined by the Jared Eliot gateway) is used for seminars and meetings of small student organizations.

The Branford College Library is located in the middle courtyard of Branford College, named Calliope Court. The student rooms and common areas are decorated with stained glass by G. Owen Bonawit.  Branford's architect, James Gamble Rogers, required that at least one pane on every window be broken and then soldered back together, resulting in a Y-shape in many of the windows.

The student-led committee, Branford College Council (BCC), coordinates events around Branford College.

The basement of the College houses the College's student-run buttery, a computer cluster, a small weight room, two squash courts, a dance studio, a basketball court, a digital media center, a game room, a student kitchen, a pottery studio, a printing press, and laundry facilities. The basement was remodeled just more than a decade ago, with the rest of the college. 
First-year Branfordians live in entryways A through C of Vanderbilt Hall on Old Campus and share the building with the first-year students of Saybrook College, who live in entryways D through F of the same building.  The college was renovated in 2000 as part of the University's renovation of all the residential colleges.

Heads and Deans

In 2016, the title of "Master" was changed to "Head of College"

Notable alumni
John Ashcroft, 1964, 79th United States attorney general and Missouri Governor and senator.
Richard H. Brodhead, 1968, 9th President of Duke University and former Dean of Yale College.
Bruce Donald, 1980, computational biologist and drug designer, James B. Duke Professor of Computer Science and Biochemistry at Duke University.
Ann Olivarius, 1977, feminist attorney.
James Rothman, 1971, cell biologist 2013 Nobel Prize in Medicine laureate. 
Meghan O'Rourke, 1997, poet and staff writer for The New Yorker
Sarah Sze, contemporary artist and  United States Representative for the 55th  Venice Biennale.
Maxim Thorne, 1989, American writer, philanthropist and civil rights advocate; served as a senior leader for the NAACP.
Lauren Willig, 1999, author
Edward Wyckoff Williams, 1998, graduate of Yale College, journalist and author.

Fictional
Rory Gilmore from Gilmore Girls
Richard Gilmore from Gilmore Girls
Paris Geller from Gilmore Girls

References

External links

Branford College Website

Residential colleges of Yale University
University and college dormitories in the United States